Woodlawn High School (WHS) is a four-year public high school in Baltimore County, Maryland, United States. The school opened in the fall of 1961. Prior to that, students in the area attended Catonsville, Milford Mill, or Franklin High Schools. In the fall of 2017, Woodlawn offered an Early College Program to help students prepare for university education.

There are over 40 various extracurriculars, sports, programs, and activities for students.

Location
The school is located just east of the Baltimore Beltway and north of Maryland Route 122, Security Boulevard.

Woodlawn High School's district borders the districts of Pikesville High School, Randallstown High School, Milford Mill High School, and Catonsville High School in Baltimore County.

Academics
Woodlawn High school received a 37.8 out of a possible 100 points (37%) on the 2018–2019 Maryland State Department of Education Report Card and received a 2 out of 5-star rating, ranking in the 11th percentile among all Maryland schools.

Students
The 2019–2020 enrollment at Woodlawn High School was 1656 students.

The graduation rate at Woodlawn High School over the past 15 years peaked in 1999 at 98% and dropped to 89% in 2006. Its graduation rate is currently 90%.

Woodlawn High School is one of the largest high schools in the Baltimore County Public School system.

In 2008, the school was 61% African-American, 19% Hispanic and Native American, 11% Asian/Pacific Islander, 7% White, and 2% European-American.  Almost 13% of the students received special education, and over 42% of the students received free or reduced lunches, one of the highest rates in the county.

Athletics

State championships
Volleyball
Class AA 1982
Boys Indoor Track
Class AA 1987, 1988
3A-2A 1998 
Baseball
Class AA 1986
Boys Outdoor Track and Field
Class AA 1987, 1988
Class A 1998

Notable alumni
 Carlton Bailey, NFL linebacker for Buffalo Bills, New York Giants, and Carolina Panthers
 Charles Belfoure, architect and writer
 Keion Carpenter, NFL safety for Buffalo Bills and Atlanta Falcons
Joan Cassis, photographer
 Ta-Nehisi Coates, writer for The Atlantic
 Robert Curbeam, NASA astronaut on Space Shuttle Atlantis
 Corey Fuller, NFL wide receiver for Detroit Lions
 Vincent Fuller, NFL safety for Tennessee Titans
 Hae Min Lee, student killed in 1999
 Kevin Liles, music executive; former President of Def Jam Records
 Joni Eareckson Tada, Christian Author and evangelical leader
 Thiruvendran Vignarajah, lawyer; clerk to Supreme Court Justice Stephen Breyer; Assistant United States Attorney for Maryland
 Krishanti Vignarajah, lawyer; former Senior Advisor at the State Department; former Policy Director to Michelle Obama
 Torrance Zellner, track and field athlete; bronze medals winner at the 1991 and 1999 Pan American Games

References and notes

See also
 List of Schools in Baltimore County, Maryland

External links

 http://woodlawnhs.bcps.org/

Educational institutions established in 1941
Public high schools in Maryland
Baltimore County Public Schools
Middle States Commission on Secondary Schools
Magnet schools in Maryland
Woodlawn, Baltimore County, Maryland
1941 establishments in Maryland